Neapoli is a town and a former municipality in Kozani regional unit, West Macedonia, Greece. Since the 2011 local government reform it is part of the municipality Voio, of which it is a municipal unit. The municipal unit has an area of 238.277 km2, the community 22.001 km2. The municipal unit has a population of 4,100 while the community has 2,323 inhabitants (2011). Present-day Neapoli was once known as the ancient town of Palladium.
In the Ottoman period it was named Anaselítsa or Nasliç  and had a large population of Greek Muslims referred to by locals as Vallahades.

References

Populated places in Kozani (regional unit)
Former municipalities in Western Macedonia